Kazungula may refer to one of several adjacent places on the Zambezi River in central Africa:

Kazungula, Botswana, a village
Kazungula, Zambia, a town
Kazungula District, a district of Zambia
Kazungula, Zimbabwe, a small settlement

See also 
Kazungula Ferry
Kazungula Bridge